Amelie Stoll (born 21 November 1995) is a German judoka.

She is the bronze medallist of the 2017 Judo Grand Prix The Hague in the -57 kg category.

References

External links
 

1995 births
Living people
German female judoka
21st-century German women